Antoine Ntsana Nkounkou (born 13 September 1948) is a Congolese sprinter. He competed in the men's 4 × 100 metres relay at the 1972 Summer Olympics.

References

External links
 

1948 births
Living people
Athletes (track and field) at the 1972 Summer Olympics
Republic of the Congo male sprinters
Olympic athletes of the Republic of the Congo
Place of birth missing (living people)